Japan–New Zealand relations refers to the diplomatic relations between Japan and New Zealand. Both nations are members of APEC, Australia Group, CPTPP, Organization for Economic Co-operation and Development and the United Nations.

History

Initial contact between Japan and New Zealand was via London as New Zealand was a part of the British Empire. In 1898 Arthur Stanhope Aldrich was appointed as an honorary consul in New Zealand after retiring from a career in the Japanese civil service. In 1928, while New Zealand was a self-governing dominion within the British Empire, Japan and New Zealand signed a provisional arrangement concerning commerce, customs and navigation. Japan opened a consulate in Wellington in 1938 but this closed in 1942 after Japan entered World War II. During World War II, New Zealand forces fought against Japan, primarily in Singapore, the Solomon Islands and in the waters surrounding Japan. Towards the end of the war, in 1944, New Zealand warships HMNZS Achilles and HMNZS Gambia bombarded the Japanese coast. The war in the Pacific soon ended after the American atomic bombings of Hiroshima and Nagasaki in August 1945. New Zealand troops known as J Force occupied Japan after the war to help with clean-up and reconstruction.

New Zealand and Australia both favoured a harsh treaty with Japan after 1945. However Australia's fear of a Japanese threat was greater, while New Zealand regarded Europe as the most likely area of future conflict. However when Washington desired a softer approach to Japan, New Zealand and Australia both wanted American guarantees for their security. The U.S. did this with the three-way ANZUS Pact signed in San Francisco in September 1951 before the peace conference opened.

In 1952, New Zealand and Japan established diplomatic relations and that same year, New Zealand opened a diplomatic legation in Tokyo. The following year, Japan opened a legation in Wellington. In 1955, Prime Minister Sidney Holland became the first New Zealand head of government to pay an official visit to Japan. The visit was reciprocated in 1957 by Japanese Prime Minister Nobusuke Kishi. In 1958 the two nations signed a commercial treaty that began their modern economic relationship. New Zealand showed little interest in trade with Japan in the 1950s. However it feared losing its British market for agricultural products. It was clear that with mainland China was under hostile Communist control more trade with Japan would be wise.

Since 1958, Japan and New Zealand have developed strong political ties with common views and a shared interest in the stability, growth and development of the Asia Pacific region. In April 2012, both nations celebrated 60 years of diplomatic relations.

In July 2021 despite COVID-19 pandemic spreading in the worldwide, many New Zealand Olympic teams were travelled to Japan during 2020 Summer Olympics. As of result, New Zealand team collected a total of 20 medals: 7 gold, 6 silver, and 7 bronze, at these Games, surpassing the record of 18 gained at the 2016 Summer Olympics.

High-level visits

Bilateral agreements
Both nations have signed several bilateral agreements such as a Provisional Arrangement concerning Commerce, Customs and Navigation (1929); Agreement on Commerce (1958); Agreement on the Avoidance of Double Taxation and the Prevention of Fiscal Evasion with Respect to Taxes on Income (1963); Agreement concerning Reciprocal Waiving of Passport Visas and Passport Visa Fees (1970); Agreement on Fisheries (1978); Agreement on Air Services (1980) and an Agreement on Working Holiday Visas (1985).

Tourism and transportation
In 2014, 81,000 Japanese citizens visited New Zealand for tourism. That same period, over 41,000 New Zealanders visited Japan for tourism. There are direct flights between Japan and New Zealand with Air New Zealand.

Trade
In 2016, trade between Japan and New Zealand totalled US$6.4 billion. Japan's main exports to New Zealand include motor vehicles and electronic goods. New Zealand's main exports to Japan include timber, aluminium, dairy (especially cheese), kiwifruit and beef. The timber trade between New Zealand and Japan is considered so important to the production of wood products in the latter that the timber export sheds at Wellington’s port were, for a long time, adorned with Ukiyo-e portraits of Kabuki actors.

Resident diplomatic missions
 Japan has an embassy in Wellington, a consulate-general in Auckland and a consular office in Christchurch.
 New Zealand has an embassy in Tokyo.

See also 

 Foreign relations of Japan
 Foreign relations of New Zealand
 Japanese New Zealanders

References

Further reading
 Asia New Zealand Foundation. New Zealanders' Perceptions of Asia and Asian Peoples: 1997-2011 (Wellington: Asia New Zealand Foundation, 2013); annual survey.
 Brocklebank, Laurie W. Jayforce. New Zealand and the Military Occupation of Japan, 1945-48. Auckland: Oxford University Press, 1997).
 Harris, Holly. "New Zealand's Identity and New Zealand-Japan Relations: 1945-2014." (Thesis, Victoria University of Wellington, 2015) online.
 Iwami, Tadashi. "Strategic partnership between Japan and New Zealand: foundation, development and prospect." Pacific Review (2020): 1-28. https://doi.org/10.1080/09512748.2020.1769156 

 Kennaway, Richard. New Zealand foreign policy, 1951-1971 (1972) online
 Kennedy, Ian. Japan and New Zealand: Adding Value (Wellington: Victoria University Press for the Institute of Policy Studies, 1992).
 McGee, Alan, et al. "Japanese language education in New Zealand: An evaluative literature review of the decline in students since 2005." (2013). online
 McKinnon, Malcolm. Independence and foreign policy: New Zealand in the world since 1935 (Auckland University Press, 2013).
 McNeil, Ken. "New Zealand through a Japanese glass 1869–1944." Japan Forum (2006) 18#1 pp 23–43
 Peren, Roger. Japan and New Zealand 150 Years (Tokyo: New Zealand Centre for Japanese Studies, 1999).
 Ryan, Greg. "‘He is Our Opponent, Not Our Enemy’: Two Rugby Tours and Australasian Perceptions of Japan during the 1930s." International Journal of the History of Sport 36.12 (2019): 1076-1095.

 Trotter, Ann. "Coming to Terms with Japan: New Zealand's Experience, 1945--63" in Conflict and Amity in East Asia: Essays in Honour of Ian Nish: ed by T.G. Fraser and Peter Lowe, (1992)  pp 125–142.
 Trotter, Ann. New Zealand and Japan 1945-1952: the occupation and the peace treaty (A&C Black, 2013).
 Wallace, Corey. "Dealing with a Proactive Japan: Reconsidering Japan’s Regional Role and Its Value for New Zealand’s Foreign Policy." in Small States and the Changing Global Order (Springer, Cham, 2019) pp. 193-211.
 Wevers, Maarten. Japan, Its Future, and New Zealand (Wellington: Victoria University Press for the Institute of Policy Studies, 1988).

 
New Zealand
Japan